Events in the year 1958 in Israel.

Incumbents
 Prime Minister of Israel – David Ben-Gurion (Mapai)
 President of Israel – Yitzhak Ben-Zvi
 President of the Supreme Court – Yitzhak Olshan
 Chief of General Staff - Moshe Dayan until 29 January, Haim Laskov
 Government of Israel - 7th Government of Israel until 17 December, 8th Government of Israel

Events

 7 January – Prime Minister David Ben-Gurion presents his cabinet for a Knesset "Vote of Confidence". The 8th Government is approved that day and the members were sworn in.
 29 January – Haim Laskov is appointed as the fifth Chief of Staff of the Israel Defense Forces.
 12 February – Israel's Knesset passes the Basic Knesset Law (חוק יסוד: הכנסת).
 8 April – The founding of the moshav Aviezer.
 22 April – Jordanian soldiers shot and killed two Israeli fishermen near Aqaba.
 19 August – The first International Bible Contest is held - in the International Convention Center in Jerusalem.
 17 November – Syrian militants killed the wife of the British air attaché in Israel, who was staying at the guesthouse of the Italian Convent on the Mount of Beatitudes.

Israeli–Palestinian conflict 
The most prominent events related to the Israeli–Palestinian conflict which occurred during 1958 include:

Notable Palestinian militant operations against Israeli targets

The most prominent Palestinian fedayeen terror attacks committed against Israelis during 1958 include:

 11 February – Armed Palestinian Arab militants killed a resident of moshav Yanuv who was on his way to Kfar Yona, in the Sharon area.
 5 April – Armed Palestinian Arab militants lying in an ambush shot and killed two Israeli civilians near Tel Lakhish.
 26 May – Armed Palestinian Arab militants killed four Israeli police officers at Mount Scopus, in Jerusalem.
 3 December – Armed Palestinian Arab militants killed a shepherd at Kibbutz Gonen.

Notable Israeli military operations against Palestinian militancy targets

The most prominent Israeli military counter-terrorism operations (military campaigns and military operations) carried out against Palestinian militants during 1958 include:

Unknown dates

 The Israeli motor vehicle manufacturer Autocars Co. presents the first Sussita (סוסיתא) car.
 The construction of the Negev Nuclear Research Center begins with French assistance.
 The founding of the moshav Givat Yeshayahu.
 The founding of the kibbutz Adamit.

Notable births
 6 January – Shlomo Glickstein, former Israeli tennis player.
 5 May – Ron Arad, Israeli soldier classified as missing in action after being captured in Lebanon in 1986.
 29 May – Juliano Mer-Khamis, Israeli actor, filmmaker and political activist of Jewish and Arab origin (died 2011).
 1 June – Ahron Bregman, Israeli-English political scientist and journalist
 8 July – Tzipi Livni, Israeli politician, the Israeli Opposition Leader between 2009 and 2012, former leader of the Kadima party.
 4 August – Silvan Shalom, Israeli politician.
 27 November – Anat Atzmon, Israeli actress and singer.

Notable deaths
 18 May – Jacob Fichman (born 1881), Romanian-born Israeli poet and essayist.
 13 June – Siegfried Lehman (born 1892), German-born Israeli educator.
 27 October – Joseph Klausner (born 1874), Russian (Lithuania)-born Israeli Jewish historian and professor of Hebrew Literature.

Major public holidays

See also
 1958 in Israeli music
 1958 in Israeli sport

References

External links